Bonanza Banzai was a popular Hungarian synth-pop band formed in Budapest in 1988. Their sound was based on the synth-pop genre, and they were known as the "Hungarian Depeche Mode".

The band released a total of eight studio albums and two live albums, of which five became gold.

After six years of recording music, the band broke up in 1994. Their lead vocalist Ákos Kovács has maintained a  solo career since.

Members 
 Zsolt Hauber – synthesizer, piano, percussion
 Ákos Kovács – vocals, guitar, drums
 Gábor Menczel – synthesizer

Discography 
 1989 – Induljon a banzáj!
 1990 – A jel
 1990 – The Compilation
 1991 – 1984
 1991 – Pillanat emlékműve
 1991 – Monumentum
 1992 – Bonanza Live Banzai
 1992 – Elmondatott
 1993 – Régi és új
 1994 – Jóslat
 1995 – Búcsúkoncert
 2008 – Bonanza Banzai DVD (appeared on the 20th anniversary of the debut of the band)

References 

Synthpop groups
Hungarian pop music groups